Archestratus ( Archestratos) was an ancient Greek poet of Gela or Syracuse, in Sicily, who wrote some time in the mid 4th century BCE, and was known as "the Daedalus of tasty dishes". His humorous didactic poem Hedypatheia ("Life of Luxury"), written in hexameters but known only from quotations, advises a gastronomic reader on where to find the best food in the Mediterranean world. The writer, who was styled in antiquity the Hesiod or Theognis of gluttons, parodies the pithy style of older gnomic poets; most of his attention is given to fish, although some fragments refer to appetizers, and there was also a section on wine. His poem had a certain notoriety among readers in the 4th and 3rd centuries BCE: it was referred to by the comic poet Antiphanes, by Lynceus of Samos and by the philosophers Aristotle, Chrysippus and Clearchus of Soli. In nearly every case these references are disparaging, implying that Archestratus's poem—like the sex manual by Philaenis - was likely to corrupt its readers. This attitude is exemplified in the Deipnosophistae with citations of Chrysippus:

Sixty-two fragments from Archestratus's poem (including two doubtful items) survive, all via quotation by Athenaeus in the Deipnosophistae. The poem was translated or imitated in Latin by Ennius, a work that has not survived. The standard edition of the fragments, with commentary and translation, is by Olson and Sens (2000).

References

Andrew Dalby, "Archestratos: where and when?" in Food in antiquity ed. John Wilkins and others (Exeter: Exeter University Press, 1995) pp. 400–412.
 Kathryn Koromilas, "Feasting with Archestratus" in Odyssey (November/December 2007)
S. Douglas Olson and Alexander Sens, Archestratos of Gela: Greek Culture and Cuisine in the Fourth Century BCE. Oxford: Oxford University Press, 2000. [Text, translation, commentary.]
John Wilkins, Shaun Hill, Archestratus: The life of luxury. Totnes: Prospect Books, 1994. [Introduction, translation, commentary.] Online text of introduction

Ancient Greek poets
Ancient Geloans
Ancient Syracusans
Ancient Greek food writers
4th-century BC Greek people
4th-century BC poets
Ancient Greek didactic poets
Poets of Magna Graecia
Year of birth unknown
Year of death unknown